The 2019–20 Maltese Division 1 season, is the premier men's basketball competition in Malta.

Competition format
Five teams joined the regular season and competed in a double-legged round-robin tournament. The four best qualified teams of the regular season joined the playoffs.

Regular season

League table

Results

References

External links
Malta Basketball Association
Eurobasket.com

Malta
Basketball in Malta